Lonchocarpus urucu, or barbasco, is plant in the family Fabaceae. It was also recorded in Venezuela.

Cubé resin, the root extract from Barbasco and from cubé (Lonchocarpus utilis), is used as a commercial insecticide and piscicide (fish poison).  The major active ingredients are rotenone and deguelin.  Although "organic" (produced by nature), rotenone is no longer considered an environmentally safe chemical.

Taxonomic status
The taxonomic status as a species with the name Lonchocarpus urucu ist still to be resolved, as it is also considered a variety of Deguelia rufescens: Deguelia rufescens var. urucu (Killip & A.C.Sm.) A.M.G.Azeved.

Toxicity
Barbasco is toxic to insects, fish, and other pests. The primary threat to humans and other mammals comes from inhaling the powdered root or root extract. It has been used by the Shuar people of Ecuador and the Nukak people of Colombia as a poison for fishing.

References

Zipcode Zoo - Barbasco

urucu
Flora of Brazil
Flora of Guyana
Flora of Peru